King of Crown Heights is a 1992 American documentary film on the Chabad-Lubavitch Hasidic movement of Brooklyn, New York. The film was directed by Ruggero Gabbai. The film was aired by PBS.

See also 
 The Return: A Hasidic Experience

References 

Films about Orthodox and Hasidic Jews
Films about Chabad